These hits topped the Ultratop 50 in the Flanders region of Belgium in 1981.

See also
1981 in music

References

1981 in Belgium
1981 record charts
1981